Melanie Leishman (born February 20, 1989) is a Canadian actress. She is best known for portraying bespectacled Hannah B. Williams, one of the main characters on the cult horror/comedy television series Todd and the Book of Pure Evil. Before that she had a recurring role on Darcy's Wild Life as Kathi Giraldi and raucous comedy series House Party (2008) as desperate to be popular Mandy. Other TV credits include Being Erica, Republic of Doyle and Murdoch Mysteries. She's also voiced several animated roles in series such as Detentionaire and Grojband.
Film roles include musical/slasher Stage Fright (2014) as Liz Silver, comedy-drama The Exchange (2021) as Diane and Christmas romantic-comedy Single All the Way (2021) as Ashleigh.

Early life
Melanie Leishman began acting, singing, and dancing at the age of eight. Leishman was in her first play while attending The North York Montessori, in grade three, starring as Annie in the play Annie. She attended the Earl Haig Secondary School in the Claude Watson Arts Program as a drama major, involved in both drama and dance programs there.

Career

Film
Her first theatrically released film was a supporting role in Victoria Day (2009).

In the 2010 short film The Long Autumn, about a boy (Devon Bostick) that grows up alone on a strange island and eventually encounters fellow humans but needs to gain a pair of boots before being accepted, she was the sweetly naive serving girl Ladeeda.

Quirky romantic/drama Old Stock (2012) saw her playing sparky love interest Patti, an arsonist serving community service teaching dance classes at an old peoples' home.

Musical/slasher Stage Fright (2014) cast her somewhat against type, having mostly been cast as "best friend of the lead" or generally timid characters, in this film she's the "mean girl" Diva like Liz Silver who acts as a rival to the film's central protagonist.

In 2016, she appeared in the film Below Her Mouth as Claire.

She reprised her role of Hannah alongside the rest of the original cast in Todd and the Book of Pure Evil: The End of the End, a feature length animated film that concluded the cult TV series, which was released in 2017.

2018 short comedy-drama film Softcore saw Melanie Leishman co-star with Alyssa Owsiany as a pair of bridesmaids that bond over exchanging the bizarre stories of their sexual awakenings.

Most recently she appeared in the 80's set comedy-drama The Exchange (2021) as Diane, the teacher's assistant and long suffering girlfriend to primary antagonist gym teacher Gary Rothbauer (Justin Hartley) plus Christmas set romantic comedy Single All the Way (2021) as Ashleigh, young mother of two small children and a supportive sister to the lead Peter (Michael Urie).

Television
Her first television role was in the children's/family series Darcy's Wild Life (2004-06) as Kathi Giraldi.

2008 saw the release of two TV movies with her in. As Angie Bremlock in Never Cry Werewolf, wherein a werewolf moves in to terrorize a neighborhood, and True Confessions of a Hollywood Starlet, where she was Emily a girl who unwittingly befriends incognito teen celebrity Morgan Carter (Joanna "JoJo" Levesque). Incidentally True Confessions of a Hollywood Starlet also featured her future Todd and the Book of Pure Evil co-star Bill Turnbull in a small role. 

The same year she was part of the main cast of characters in House Party (2008), the desperate to please Mandy. Each episode focuses on a particular character, revealing the various plot developments to the audience as they are encountered by the episode's focal character. The show was re-released in 2021 by the production company Farpoint Distribution on their YouTube channel.

2009 saw a role in Being Erica, Season 2, Episode 19 "Shhh... Don't Tell" playing Fiona Watt, a student that's being mercilessly bullied and humiliated by other classmates.

In 2010 she co-starred in the Canadian television horror/comedy series Todd and the Book of Pure Evil as science geek Hannah B. Williams who forms part of the team at Crowley High School that "fights evil with mixed results". The show was renewed for a second season, that aired in 2011, where she reprised her role as Hannah. Leishman shared a Gemini Award for "Best Ensemble Performance in a Comedy Program or Series" with her cast mates for their work on the show.

In 2011 she voiced bossy popular girl Brandy Silver in the school set mystery animated series Detentionaire and also voiced the overly perky and thus aptly named Chipper in Grojband.

She has appeared twice in long running detective series Murdoch Mysteries, as two different characters. First as Nancy Booth, a taken advantage of maid, in "Downstairs, Upstairs" and later as Sarah Harrison, who gets entwined in espionage between the US and Canada following the assassination of U.S. President William McKinley, in "The Spy Who Came Up to the Cold".

In 2018 she starred as two very different twin sisters and lead characters Kristal and Kyle Hasting in the web series Kristal Clear, for which she won the award for "Best Lead Actress in a Comedy" at the HollyWeb Fest. In 2019 Kristal Clear season 2 got approved for funding by the Independent Production Fund (IPF).

In 2022 - Leishman played Remi Belcourt in episode "Between" of medical drama Transplant, a patient admitted to the emergency department with burns whose accident ends up revealing some uncomfortable truths about her boyfriend. In episode "One Wild Night" of police procedural drama Hudson & Rex, Leishman plays bridesmaid Quincy Thomas whose straight talking about a murder victim after a bachelorette party leads to her being a suspect. She plays Christina, assistant and confidant of caterer Molly Frost (Merritt Patterson) in Great American Family's romantic TV movie Catering Christmas.

Filmography

Film

Television

Awards and nominations

References

External links

1989 births
Canadian television actresses
Living people
Canadian child actresses
Canadian film actresses
Canadian Screen Award winners